In sociology, the ruling class of a society is the social class who set and decide the political and economic agenda of society. In Marxist philosophy, the ruling class are the capitalist social class who own the means of production and apply their cultural hegemony to determine and establish the dominant ideology (culture, mores, norms, traditions) of the society. In the 21st century, the worldwide political economy established by globalization has created a transnational capitalist class who are not native to any one country.

Background
In previous modes of production, such as feudalism (inheritable property and rights), the feudal lords of the manor were the ruling class; in an economy based upon chattel slavery, the slave owners were the ruling class. The political economy of the feudal system gave socio-economic and legal power to the feudal lord over the life, labour, and property of the vassal, including military service. The political economy of a slave state gave the slaver socio-economic and legal power over the person, labour, and property of a slave.

In Marxist philosophy, the capitalist society has two social classes: (i) the ruling-class bourgeoisie (capitalist class) who own the means of production as private property; and (ii) the working-class proletariat whom the bourgeoisie subject to the exploitation of labour, which form of political economy is justified by the dominant ideology of the ruling class. To replace the capitalist mode of production in a society, Marxism seeks to void the political legitimacy of the ruling class to hold power of government. Afterwards, the proletariat (the urban working class and the peasantry) assume political and socio-economic power as the ruling class of society.

In the political economies of the former marxist-leninist states, the nomenklatura are the ruling class who control the means of production, allocate resources, etc for the society, per the directions of the party. As the administrators of the bureaucracy required to realise the socio-economic functions of the state. In that vein, the sociologist C. Wright Mills identified and distinguished between the ruling class and the power élite who make the decisions for society.

Likewise, to establish a society without social classes, Anarchism seeks to abolish the ruling class. Unlike the Marxist perspective, anarchists, such as Mikhail Bakunin, seek to abolish the state, because, despite revolutionary change, the (captalist) ruling class would be replaced by another ruling class (the proletariat), which is a political cycle that voids the social-change purpose of a revolution.

Concerning the existence of a functional ruling class in 21st-century societies, Mattei Dogan said that the political and socio-economic élites do not form a cohesive ruling class within their societies because of the social stratification and the narrow specialisation of labour consequent to the globalization of the world economy. In contrast, for the 20th century, he identifies the combination of military defeat, political implosion and the presence of a charismatic leader as the drivers for the downfall of ruling classes in the Russian Empire and in the Ottoman Empires and later for the creation of Vichy France.

In the media 

There are several examples of ruling class systems in films, novels, television shows, and video games. The 2005 American independent film The American Ruling Class written by former Harper's Magazine editor Lewis Lapham and directed by John Kirby is a semi-documentary that examines how the American economy is structured and for whom. The 2017-2018 Philippine political crime-suspense epic Wildflower is about a rich influential and corrupt political family, the Ardientes, ruling over a town where a wave of murders and crimes which they have committed washed over.

Society, in the novel Brave New World, by Aldous Huxley, is eusocial with a genetically engineered caste system. The alpha++ class is the ruling class having been bred as scientists and administrators and control the World State in the novel. This situation can also be found in the George Orwell novel Nineteen Eighty-Four where the inner party as symbolized by the fictitious Big Brother literally controls what everyone in the outer party hears, sees and learns, albeit without genetic engineering and on the model of Stalinist communism having taken over the Anglosphere (Oceania). In Oceania, the ignorant masses ("proles") are relatively free as they pose no threat to oligarchical collectivism ("Big Brother").

Examples in films include Gattaca, where the genetically-born were superior and the ruling class; and V for Vendetta, which depicted a powerful totalitarian government in Britain. The comedic film The Ruling Class was a satire of British aristocracy, depicting nobility as self-serving and cruel, juxtaposed against an insane relative who believes that he is Jesus Christ, whom they identify as a "bloody Bolshevik".

See also

References

Further reading 

 
 Dogan, Mattei (ed.), Elite Configuration at the Apex of Power, Brill, Leiden, 2003.

Social classes
Social inequality
High society (social class)
Upper class
Power (social and political) concepts
Decision-making